Nicolás Arnaldo Núñez Rojas, nicknamed Nico, (born 12 September 1984) is a Chilean football manager and former player who played as a midfielder. He is the current manager of Magallanes.

Núñez began his career with Universidad Católica in 2001, and subsequently played for Albacete Balompié in 2006 and Everton de Viña del Mar in 2007.

Club career
He participated in the South American championships in Arequipa, Peru, alongside Mauricio Pinilla, Mark Gonzalez, Luis Jimenez and was debuted by U. Catholic in the first division, against University of Chile. In that institution, he always admitted that he stayed in good shape, even achieving goal scoring.

He had a season loan to Puerto Montt Sports, where he scored many goals and returned to the Catholic University. Then he went to the preseason Spanish club, Albacete, in which that year he was hired by loaner Everton Viña del Mar. On February 18, 2007, he played his 2nd game scoring a goal against Audax Italiano.

The Catholic University celebrated the goal by making him have a bond for the institution, it made him to remember what he wanted to return at some point.

In mid-2007, Nico was signed by C. University where he always has good relationships with the colleagues. In late 2008, he was transferred to U. Spanish, Nico is currently playing for CD Huachipato

Managerial career
After working as the assistant coach of both Ariel Pereyra and Fernando Vergara, in March 2021 he became the manager of Magallanes in the Primera B de Chile.

Honours

Player
Universidad Católica
 Primera División de Chile: 2005 Clausura

Huachipato
 Primera División de Chile: 2012 Clausura

Manager
Magallanes
 Primera B de Chile: 2022
 Copa Chile: 2022

References

External links

Albacete profile

1984 births
Living people
Footballers from Santiago
Chilean footballers
Chilean expatriate footballers
Club Deportivo Universidad Católica footballers
Puerto Montt footballers
Albacete Balompié players
Everton de Viña del Mar footballers
Unión Española footballers
Ñublense footballers
C.D. Huachipato footballers
San Marcos de Arica footballers
Magallanes footballers
Deportes Magallanes footballers
Chilean Primera División players
Segunda División players
Primera B de Chile players
Expatriate footballers in Spain
Chilean expatriate sportspeople in Spain
Association football midfielders
Chilean football managers
Primera B de Chile managers
Chilean Primera División managers
Magallanes managers